762 Naval Air Squadron (762 NAS) was a Naval Air Squadron of the Royal Navy's Fleet Air Arm. It formed at RNAS Yeovilton in March 1942 as an Advanced Flying Training School. Almost immediately the squadron relocated to RNAS St Merryn, but before the end of the year, it was back at Yeovilton. 762 NAS disbanded nine months later.

The squadron reformed in 1944 at RNAS Lee-on-Solent, as a Twin Engine Conversion Unit, but immediately moved to RNAS Dale, where it operated a variety of multi engined aircraft. At the end of 1945 the squadron moved to RNAS Halesworth and RNAS Ford in quick succession. Now known as the Heavy Twin Conversion Unit  it spent nearly two and a half years at Ford before relocating to RNAS Culdrose, where it eventually disbanded at the end of 1949.

History of 762 NAS

Advanced Flying Training School (1942 - 1943) 

762 Naval Air Squadron formed, on the 23 March 1942, at RNAS Yeovilton (HMS Heron) situated near Yeovil, Somerset, as an Advanced Flying Training School. It was initially equipped with Fulmar and Master aircraft.

It added Martlet aircraft to its inventory in June 1942.

762 NAS remained at St Merryn for the next seven months, however, on the 8 September 1942, the squadron moved back to RNAS Yeovilton. Here it added Sea Hurricane aircraft to its inventory for training and conversion. The squadron disbanded at Yeovilton on the 9 June 1943.

Twin Engine Conversion Unit (1944 - 1949) 
762 Naval Air Squadron reformed, on the 15 March 1944, at RNAS Lee-on-Solent (HMS Daedalus), situated near Lee-on-the-Solent, in Hampshire, approximately four miles west of Portsmouth, as the Twin Engine Conversion Unit. II, Beaufighter Mark IIF, Blenheim Mk.IV and Oxford and from August, Wellington GR Mark XI aircraft.

However, six weeks later, the squadron was on the move again, this time relocating to RNAS Ford (HMS Perigrine), located at Ford, in West Sussex, England.

At this time the squadron was also operating Mosquito and Sea Mosquito aircraft and it became known as the Heavy Twin Conversion Unit. It remained in this role and at Ford for around the next two and a half years,before moving to RNAS Culdrose (HMS Seahawk), near Helston on the Lizard Peninsula of Cornwall, on the 1 May 1948. 762 NAS disbanded, at Culdrose, on the 8 December 1949.

Aircraft flown

The squadron has flown a number of different aircraft types, including:

Fairey Fulmar Mk.I (Mar 1942 - Jun 1943)
Fairey Fulmar Mk.II (Mar 1942 - Jun 1943)
Miles M.9B Master I (Jun 1942 - Jun 1943)
Grumman Martlet Mk I (Jun 1942 - Jan 1943)
Sea Hurricane Mk IA (Sep 1942 - Jun 1943)
Sea Hurricane Mk IB (Sep 1942 - Jun 1943)
Supermarine Spitfire Mk I (Feb 1943 - Jun 1943)
Bristol Beaufighter Mark IIF (Mar 1944 - 1945)
Bristol Beaufort Mk.I (Mar 1944 - May 1944)
Bristol Beaufort T Mk. II (Mar 1944 - Aug 1946)
Airspeed Oxford (Mar 1944 - Dec 1949)
Vickers Wellington GR Mark XI (Aug 1944 - Apr 1945)
de Havilland Mosquito FB Mk. VI (Aug 1945 - Nov 1949)
de Havilland Mosquito T Mk III (Dec 1945 - Dec 1949)
de Havilland Mosquito B.35 (1946)
de Havilland Sea Mosquito TR Mk 33 (Nov 1947 - Nov 1949)
Avro Anson I (1948)

Naval Air Stations  

762 Naval Air Squadron operated from a number of naval air stations of the Royal Navy, in Wales and England:
Royal Naval Air Station YEOVILTON (23 March 1942 - 15 April 1942)
Royal Naval Air Station ST MERRYN (15 April 1942 - 8 September 1942)
Royal Naval Air Station YEOVILTON (23 March 1942 - 15 April 1942)
Royal Naval Air Station LEE-ON-SOLENT (15 March 1944 - 31 March 1944)
Royal Naval Air Station DALE (31 March 1944 - 3 December 1945)
Royal Naval Air Station HALESWORTH (3 December 1945 - 15 January 1946)
Royal Naval Air Station FORD (15 January 1946 - 1 May 1948)
Royal Naval Air Station CULDROSE (1 May 1948 - 8 December 1949)

Commanding Officers 

List of commanding officers of 762 Naval Air Squadron with month and year of appointment and end:

1942 - 1943
Lt (A) R- McD Hall, RN (Mar 1942-Sep 1942)
Lt D. B. M Fiddes DSO, RN (Sep 1942-Mar 1943)
Lt-Cdr (A) M. J. S. Newman, RN (Mar 1943-Jun 1943)

1944 - 1949
Lt-Cdr (A) S. J. Hawley, RNVR (Mar 1944-Mar 1945)
Lt-Cdr (A) T- R- Koeller, RNVR (Mar 1945-Jul 1945)
Lt-Cdr (A) J. Mills, RNVR (Jul 1945-Jun 1948)
Lt-Cdr M. Johnstone DSC, RN (Jun 1948-Feb 1949)
Lt A. L. Brown, RN (Feb 1949-Dec 1949)

References

Citations

Bibliography

700 series Fleet Air Arm squadrons
Military units and formations established in 1942
Military units and formations of the Royal Navy in World War II
1942 establishments in the United Kingdom
1949 disestablishments in the United Kingdom
Military units and formations disestablished in 1949